Minister of Tourism and Culture may refer to:

 Minister of Tourism and Culture (Malaysia)
 Minister of Tourism and Culture (The Gambia)